The 2013 Bord na Móna Walsh Cup was the 51st staging of the Walsh Cup since its establishment in 1954. The draw for the 2013 fixtures took place on 8 November 2012. The competition began on 20 January 2013 and ended on 10 February 2013.

Kilkenny were the defending champions.

Dublin won the cup for the second time in three years.

Teams
A total of twelve teams contested the Walsh Cup, including a return for all the teams from the 2012 Walsh Cup.

Antrim made a return to the Walsh Cup in 2013, after pulling out of the previous year's competition.

Results

First round

Quarter-finals

Semi-finals

Final

References

Walsh Cup
Walsh Cup (hurling)